Colorblends is a distributor of flower bulbs based in Bridgeport, Connecticut. The company was founded in the Netherlands by the Schipper family in 1912. Colorblends is Holland's largest tulip bulb mail-order operation based in the United States.

Background

The company's website says that Schipper & Company started in the Netherlands in 1912. Cornelis Schipper moved the company to the United States after World War II. Cornelis Nicolaas Schipper was born into a tulip farming family. He emigrated to the United States in 1947 and when he arrived he borrowed $1000 and purchased a car. He drove around getting orders in different towns for flower bulbs. He serviced florists and wholesale growers. Schipper & Company USA is still a privately owned business and Colorblends is part of the company. The company is owned by Tim Schipper.

The company is located on the west side of Bridgeport, Connecticut and they feature a spring flower garden attraction called the "Colorblends Garden". The company operates under the trade names: Colorblends Wholesale Flowerbulbs and Colorblends Bulb Company. They have annual revenue of $4,480,480 and they employ 14 people at the Connecticut location.

Museum
Colorblends is one of the founders of the Amsterdam Tulip Museum in the Netherlands. Colorblends is Holland's largest tulip bulb mail-order operation in the United States.

References

Flowers
American companies established in 1912
Companies established in the 20th century
 
1912 establishments in Connecticut